The Rio Santa Rosa salamander (Bolitoglossa digitigrada) is a species of salamander in the family Plethodontidae.
It is endemic to Peru.
Its natural habitats are subtropical or tropical swamps, subtropical or tropical moist montane forests, and plantations .

References

Bolitoglossa
Amphibians of Peru
Endemic fauna of Peru
Amphibians described in 1982
Taxonomy articles created by Polbot